The Changchun Institute of Technology (CIT) is a key university in Changchun, Jilin, China, founded in 1951.

Overview
Changchun Institute of Technology is a multi-disciplinary full-time university with a primary focus on engineering, but also offers degrees in management, business, and the humanities. CIT is affiliated with the Jilin Provincial Government and recognized by the Jilin Province Academic Degrees Committee. CIT is further recognized by the Ministry of Education and has the power to grant bachelor and master degrees.

Including the School of Mechanical and Electrical Engineering, the School of Electronics and Information Engineering and the School of Continuing Education CIT has 20 schools and offers, with a main focus on electrical engineering and automation, civil engineering and resource exploration, altogether 54 professional courses.

Changchun Institute of Technology has enrolled international students from 13 countries.

Schools and colleges 
 School of Electrical and Information Engineering (SEIE)
 School of Civil Engineering
 School of Prospecting and Surveying Engineering
 School of Mechanical and Electrical Engineering
 School of Water Conservancy & Environment Engineering
 School of Energy and Power Engineering
 School of Management
 School of Architecture and Design
 School of Science
 School of Foreign Languages
 School of Computer Technology and Engineering
 School of International Education

References

External links
Chinese language website

 
Universities and colleges in Changchun
1951 establishments in China
Educational institutions established in 1951